D. Sudarsanam (1941/42 – 26 June 2010) was an Indian politician and Member of the Legislative Assembly of Tamil Nadu.He has three sons Amaranth, Gopinath and Aravind. He has two grandsons Pranav chitta and Ishaan raghav and four granddaughters Shivani, Jyoshita, Advaitha and Aarika

Early political life as Congress MLA 
He was elected to the Tamil Nadu legislative assembly from Poonamallee constituency as an Indian National Congress candidate in 1991 election, and as a Tamil Maanila Congress (Moopanar) candidate in 1996 election.

Tamil Maanila Congress 
He supported G. K. Moopanar when he split from Indian National Congress to form Tamil Maanila Congress. He was made the Treasurer of the party. He was elected from Tiruvallur constituency as a Tamil Maanila Congress (Moopanar) candidate in 2001 election. He remained with TMC till its merger with Congress.

Congress Legislature party leader 
He was elected as an Indian National Congress candidate in 2006 election. He served as the leader of the Congress in Tamil Nadu legislature after the 2006 election and served as acting speaker of Tamil Nadu Legislative Assembly.

Death 
He died of multiple organ failure in a hospital in Coimbatore.  He became ill and was admitted to the hospital while attending the 2010 world Tamil conference. He was 68 when he died and is survived by his three sons.

References 

1940s births
2010 deaths
Deaths from multiple organ failure
Tamil Maanila Congress politicians
Tamil Nadu MLAs 1996–2001
Tamil Nadu MLAs 2006–2011
Tamil Nadu MLAs 1991–1996
Indian National Congress politicians from Tamil Nadu